Scipion was a  74-gun ship of the line of the French Navy.

Career 
In 1792, Scipion took part in operations against Nice, Villefranche and Oneille. In December, she joined the division under Admiral Latouche Tréville, and assisted the damaged Languedoc during the storm of 21 to 23 of that month.

Captured by the British after the surrendering of Toulon by a Royalist cabale, she was commissioned with a crew of French rebels. On 28 November 1793, she caught fire by accident in the harbour of Livorno and exploded, killing 86 including her commanding officer, Captain Degoy.

Notes, citations, and references
Notes

Citations

References

Ships of the line of the French Navy
Téméraire-class ships of the line
1790 ships
Maritime incidents in 1793